The Indian 20-rupee coin (20) is a denomination of the Indian rupee. The ₹20 coin is the highest-denomination circulation coin minted in India since its introduction in 2019. The present ₹20 coin is released for circulation. The release of the coin was supposed to be in March 2020, but it was shifted to May 2020 because of the COVID-19 lockdown. This is used alongside the 20 rupee banknote. This coin was released in May 2020 along with the new series of the rupee coins.

Details
The new 20 rupee coin is a circle( it is 12 edged*) with a diameter of 27mm (millimeters) and weight of 8.54 grams. The outer ring is composed of 65 per cent copper, 15 per cent zinc and 20 per cent nickel whereas the inner ring (centre piece) is composed of 75 per cent copper, 20 per cent zinc and five per cent nickel. Designed with the help of students of National Institute of Design, Ahmedabad

Obverse 
Ashoka Pillar with the legend “Satyamev Jayate” inscribed below, flanked on the left periphery with the word “Bharat” in Hindi and on the right periphery with the word “INDIA” in English.

Reverse 
The face of the coin will bear denominational value “20” and the rupee symbol will be shown above the denominational value. The design of grains is flanked on the left periphery of the coin to depict the agricultural aspect of India. The top right and bottom right peripheries will bear the word Rs 20 in Hindi "बीस रुपये" and “TWENTY RUPEES” in English. The year of minting in international numerals will be depicted on centre of left periphery of the coin.

References

Coins of India
Rupee
Twenty-base-unit coins